Dingo refers to the Australian dingo

Dingo may also refer to:

Mammals 
 Canis lupus dingo, a taxonomic grouping that includes the Australian dingo and other related canines.
 Carolina dog, a domestic dog breed also known as the “American dingo”

Arts and entertainment

Characters
 Dingo (animated character), a supporting character from the Disney animated TV series Gargoyles
 Dingo, French name for the Disney character Goofy Digeri Dingo, a supporting character from Disney animated TV series Taz-mania Dingo, in the film Monty Python and the Holy Grail, played by Carol Cleveland
 Dingo, an animal-faced superhero from the WildStorm comics universe
 Dingo Egret, the protagonist of the video game Zone of the Enders: The 2nd Runner Dingo, 'yellow dog dingo' features in "The Sing-Song of Old Man Kangaroo", tale 6 of Just So Stories by Rudyard Kipling

Film
 Dingo (film), a 1992 film
 The Dingo, a 1923 Australian silent film

Gaming
 Dingo Inc., a Japanese video game developer
 Dingo Games Inc., an independent game development company from British Columbia, Canada, that created Tasty Planet Red Dingo Games, an Adelaide-based video game development firm that made such games as PlayStation 3: Rain in Rio

Music
 Dingo (band), a Finnish rock act
 The Dingoes, an Australian rock act
 Dingo (soundtrack), the soundtrack to the 1992 film, recorded by Miles Davis
 Dingo Creek Jazz and Blues Festival, an Australian music festival

Other
 Dingo (novel), a 1913 novel by Octave Mirbeau
 Dingo Studios, a fake children's TV studio from the Nickelodeon TV show iCarly''

People
 Ernie Dingo (born 1956), Aboriginal Australian entertainer
 nickname of Dino Restelli (1924–2006), American Major League Baseball player 
 nickname of Dingwall Latham Bateson (1898–1967), British solicitor and President of the Law Society
 Dingo Warrior, a ring name of American professional wrestler James Brian Hellwig

Places
 Dingo, Queensland, a town in Australia along the Capricorn Highway
 Dingo Creek, a river in the Mid North Coast region of New South Wales, Australia
 Dingo, a town in Angola

In the military
 Dingo (scout car), an Australian World War II armoured scout car
 ATF Dingo, a German armoured car
 Daimler Dingo, a British armoured scout car
 Dingo, a variant of the unsuccessful De Havilland Dormouse fighter-reconnaissance biplane

Other uses
 Dingo Bar, a bar in Paris, France
 Dingo Brand, a line of dog treats and dog chews manufactured by Spectrum Brands' United Pet Group
 The Dingoes, an Australian far-right extremist group
 Mitsubishi Dingo, a mini MPV automobile
 UQFC Dingoes, a soccer team at the University of Queensland